The 1981 Danish 1st Division season was the 36th season of the Danish 1st Division league championship, governed by the Danish Football Association. It constituted the 68th edition of the Danish football championship, and saw Hvidovre IF win their third championship title.

The Danish champions qualified for the European Cup 1982-83, while the second placed teams qualified for the UEFA Cup 1982-83. The three lowest placed teams of the tournament were directly relegated to the Danish 2nd Division for the following season. Likewise, the Danish 2nd Division champions and two first runners-up were promoted to the 1st Division.

Table

Results

Top goalscorers

External links
 Peders Fodboldstatistik
 Haslund.info

Danish 1st Division seasons
Dan
Dan
1
Top level Danish football league seasons